North Tarawa or in Gilbertese Tarawa Ieta, in the Republic of Kiribati, is the string of islets from Buariki at the northern tip of Tarawa atoll to Buota in the South, with a combined population of 6,629 . It is administratively separate from neighbouring South Tarawa, and is governed by the Eutan Tarawa Council (ETC), based at Abaokoro.

Geography

North Tarawa has a land area of 15.26 km2. It is made up of several islets; the widest part of North Tarawa can be found in the village of Buariki and the narrowest width in the village of Tearinibai, next to Buariki.

Buota was joined by a bridge to South Tarawa in 1995 and has since increased in population and is becoming more like part of urban South Tarawa.  Abatao is not accessible by road, but the channel can be easily walked at low tide and there is a boat service at high tide. For people in Abatao and Buota, it is much easier to access schools, clinics and other services on South Tarawa than to travel to the Government Station in Abaokoro.
Apart from the bridge from Buota to Tanaea, small causeways connect the villages of Tebwangoroi and Taratai, Tebwangoroi and Nuatabu. The erosion and accretion that are occurring along the shoreline is identified as being linked to aggregate mining, land reclamation and the construction of causeways that has been thought to change the currents along the shoreline.

The atoll has a protected area that is designated as the North Tarawa Conservation Area.

Villages
Abaokoro accommodates the main service infrastructures such as the offices of Eutan Tarawa Council, the junior secondary school and the main medical centre.  With the rapid growth of population in South Tarawa, people are choosing to settle in North Tarawa in greater numbers, especially in Abatao and Buota, the two villages closest to South Tarawa.
    
There are 14 villages in North Tarawa.  From North to South, the villages and their populations are:

History

Tarawa was governed as one island, under a king, until Colonial times. The colonial administrative centre of Kiribati was originally located at Taratai in North Tarawa (where the last king used to live).  The administrative centre was later moved to South Tarawa, which remains the capital of Kiribati to this day.  The decision to locate the Government on South Tarawa led to many changes; the lifestyle on South Tarawa is now almost urban, while lifestyles on North Tarawa remain based in traditional, subsistence culture.

In the early 1970s, a boat constructed at Taratai village was sailed to Fiji using traditional navigation techniques, as part of a project led by James Siers to demonstrate that Pacific seafarers were capable of making deliberate voyages of exploration in ancient times.

Economy
In North Tarawa, the subsistence lifestyle practiced throughout the Gilbert Islands coexists with a more market economy based on trade with neighboring South Tarawa.  Only 16% of the workforce are in paid employment, but a further 17% earn cash from market oriented activities. There is a strong trade in local food, building materials and other items from North Tarawa, which are sold for cash in markets and on the streets of South Tarawa.

Education

Aratokotoko Primary School is in North Tarawa. The Japanese government funded the construction of four classrooms there, spending $95,004.00 U.S. dollars (about $92,505.00 Australian dollars).

Currently there is one Christian senior high, Immaculate Heart College.

Myths and legends
North Tarawa has a special place in Kiribati mythology; the tree of life or tree of knowledge or Uekera was planted in Buariki village in North Tarawa by Nei Tekanuea. Uekera came from the south. Spirits who lived in a tree in Samoa migrated northward carrying branches from the tree. It was these spirits, together with Nareau the Wise who created the islands of Tungaru (the Gilbert Islands)

Visiting North Tarawa

Transport
There are regular ferry services from urban South Tarawa to the main villages of North Tarawa, and it is also relatively simple to charter a boat.  The road from South Tarawa ends at the channel between Buota and Abatao, but this channel can be easily walked at low tide, so that the southern islets of North Tarawa can be accessed on foot.

Accommodation
The Island Council operates a guest house at Abaokoro, providing basic accommodation for Government workers and other visitors, but also welcoming tourists.  There are also several independent homestays and lodges in North Tarawa.

Notes

References

Gilbert Islands
Tarawa
Ramsar sites in Kiribati